The 1971 Grote Prijs Jef Scherens was the eighth edition of the Grote Prijs Jef Scherens cycle race and was held on 19 September 1971. The race started and finished in Leuven. The race was won by Frans Verbeeck.

General classification

References

1971
1971 in road cycling
1971 in Belgian sport